The 2016–17 Antigua and Barbuda Premier Division was the 46th season of the Antigua and Barbuda top-flight football league. The league consists of 10 clubs that play 18 matches with a two-match series against each other club. The season began on 15 October 2016 and concluded on 19 February 2017.

Parham won the league title amassing the best record after 18 matches. It was the club's fifth title.

Clubs

Table

References

External links 
 http://antiguafootball.com/leagues-ta/premier-league/ 

1
Antigua
Antigua and Barbuda Premier Division seasons